1,1-Dichloroethane is a chlorinated hydrocarbon.  It is a colorless oily liquid with a chloroform-like odor.  It is not easily soluble in water, but miscible with most organic solvents.

Large volumes of 1,1-dichloroethane are manufactured, with annual production exceeding 1 million pounds in the United States. It is mainly used as a feedstock in chemical synthesis, chiefly of 1,1,1-trichloroethane. It is also used as a solvent for plastics, oils and fats, as a degreaser, as a fumigant in insecticide sprays, in halon fire extinguishers, and in cementing of rubber. It is used in manufacturing of high-vacuum resistant rubber and for extraction of temperature-sensitive substances.  Thermal cracking at 400–500 °C and 10 MPa yields vinyl chloride.  In the past, 1,1-dichloroethane was used as a surgical inhalational anesthetic.

Safety
1,1-dichloroethane has been on the California Proposition 65 list of known carcinogens since 1990.

In the atmosphere, 1,1-dichloroethane decomposes with half-life of 62 days, chiefly by reaction of photolytically produced hydroxyl radicals.

See also
 Dichloroethene
 Dichloroethane

References

External links
Dichloroethane and Dichloroethene on members.optushome.com.au
ATSDR - Toxic Substances Portal
CDC - NIOSH Pocket Guide to Chemical Hazards

Chloroalkanes
Organochloride insecticides
Halogenated solvents
Fire suppression agents